This article presents lists of the literary events and publications in 1582.

Events
February – Meleager, a Latin play on the mythological figure of Meleager by "Gulielmus Gagerus" (William Gager), is performed by members of Christ Church, Oxford.
November 29 – Marriage of William Shakespeare and Anne Hathaway at Temple Grafton in England.
Publication in England of the first part of Richard Mulcaster's textbook on the teaching of English, the {{Proper name|Elementarie, including "a generall table [of eight thousand words] we commonlie use}}" in regularized spelling.
Earliest reference to the publishing of private newspapers in Beijing (China).

New books

Prose
Robert Bellarmine – Disputationes
George Buchanan – Rerum Scoticarum Historia
Balthasar de Beaujoyeulx – Balet comique de la Royne
"Douay–Rheims Bible", New Testament
Richard Hakluyt – Divers Voyages Touching the Discoverie of America
John Leland –  (posthumous translation)
Anthony Munday – English Romayne Lyfe (i. e. Life of an Englishman in Rome)

Drama
Anonymous – The Rare Triumphs of Love and Fortune
Miguel de Cervantes – El cerco de Numancia
William Gager – Meleager
Giovanni Battista Guarini –

Poetry
See 1582 in poetry

Births
January 6 – Alonso de Contreras, Spanish adventurer and writer (died 1641)
January 28 – John Barclay, Scottish satirist and poet (died 1621)
February 6 – Mario Bettinus, Italian philosopher (died 1657)
April 8 (baptised) – Phineas Fletcher, English poet (died 1650)
October 17 – Johann Gerhard, German Lutheran theologian (died 1637)
November 21 – François Maynard, French poet (died 1646)
Unknown dates
Giovanni Francesco Abela, Maltese writer (died 1655)
Richard Corbet, English poet and bishop (died 1635)
William Lithgow, Scottish traveller and author (died 1645)

Deaths
January 26 – Thomas Platter, Swiss humanist writer (born 1499)
July/August – Jacques Pelletier du Mans, French humanist poet (born 1517)
September 28 – George Buchanan, Scottish historian (born 1506)
October 4 – Teresa of Ávila, Spanish mystical writer (born 1515)
Unknown dates
Arnoldus Arlenius, Dutch humanist philosopher and poet (born c.1510)
Natalis Comes, Italian mythographer, poet and historian (born 1520)
Jobus Fincelius, German humanist writer

References

Years of the 16th century in literature